Ali Gates (previously known as Ali Abdullah) is an American programmer and co-founder of Claim it!.

Early life and education
Born in Harlem, Ali got into programming in high school days and received science and technology award. Following that, he took classes at Columbia University and then later MIT.

Career
After dropping out of MIT, Ali interned and worked as a temporary software developer contractor for several companies. He started his career as a software engineer in New York City Department of Education. Later, he resigned and went on to a contract position in a foundation and ended up as being jobless.

Later, he joined Google as software developer and continued to work there until he developed Claim it!.  The key idea was to cut out the middle man and thus the expenditures. In 2016, the Claim it! became the first African American-founded company to present at the innovators lab at the Consumer Electronics Show in Las Vegas. Gates starred in Apple First TV series ‘Planet of the Apps’ alongside Jessica Alba.

References

Living people
1985 births
Businesspeople from New York City
Columbia University alumni
People from Harlem